Dannewerk is a municipality in Amt Haddeby in Schleswig-Flensburg District, Germany. It is named after the historic Danish Danevirke fortification.

References

Municipalities in Schleswig-Holstein
Schleswig-Flensburg